The Pan Jiu-Jitsu Championship or Brazilian  Jiu-Jitsu Pan American Championship (commonly known as Pan Ams or Pans), is the largest Brazilian Jiu-Jitsu tournament held in North America. The event is held annually by the International Brazilian Jiu-Jitsu Federation.

History

Representing one of the first steps toward internationalisation of Brazilian Jiu-Jitsu, the Pan-American Championship has been held annually since 1995. While the first event garnered only 250 athletes, the event has grown every year with the 2022 edition in Florida reporting over 4,600 jiu-jitsu athletes registered to compete.

The Pan Championship is one of the four IBJJF “Grand Slam” events, which include European Jiu-Jitsu Championship, Brazilian National Jiu-Jitsu Championship and World Jiu-Jitsu Championship. The IBJJF gives tournaments weighting which helps calculate the number of points an athlete can win via their participation. For the 2017/2018 IBJJF calendar the Pan American Championship has a weighting of 4 alongside the European Championship (Brazilian jiu-jitsu) making it second in importance only to the World Jiu-Jitsu Championship which has a weighting of 7.

Pan American Champions in Men's Brazilian Jiu Jitsu by Year and Weight

Pan American Champions in Women's Brazilian Jiu Jitsu by Year and Weight

Notes

References

External links
 The official IBJJF Pan-American Championship results

See also 
 IBJJF
 World Championship
 World No-Gi Championship
 Pan Jiu-Jitsu No-Gi Championship
 European Open Championship
 European Open Nogi Championship
 Brazilian National Jiu-Jitsu Championship
 Brazilian Nationals Jiu-Jitsu No-Gi Championship
 Asian Open Championship
 Abu Dhabi Combat Club Submission Wrestling World Championship

Brazilian jiu-jitsu competitions
Jiu Jitsu
Brazilian jiu-jitsu competitions in the United States